Ralph Assheton may refer to:

 Sir Ralph de Ashton or Assheton (fl. 1421–1486), 15th century nobleman, also known as 'The Black Knight'
Ralph Assheton (died 1559), MP for Liverpool (UK Parliament constituency)
 Ralph Assheton (general) (1596–1650), MP for Lancashire
 Sir Ralph Assheton, 2nd Baronet, of Lever (c. 1605–1680), MP for Clitheroe
 Sir Ralph Assheton, 2nd Baronet, of Middleton (1652–1716), MP for Liverpool and Lancashire
 Ralph Assheton (1830–1907), MP for Clitheroe
 Sir Ralph Cockayne Assheton, 1st Baronet (1860–1955)
 Ralph Assheton, 1st Baron Clitheroe (1901–1984), Conservative Party politician and MP
 Ralph Assheton, 2nd Baron Clitheroe (born 1929)

It may also refer to one of their many ancestors named Ralph Assheton: see Assheton baronets